Old School is an Australian television drama series that screened on ABC1 from 23 May to 11 July 2014. The eight-part series follows the adventures of retired criminal Lennie Cahill and retired cop Ted McCabe. The characters were originally depicted in the short film Lennie Cahill Shoots Through by Paul Oliver.

Old School was created by Paul Oliver and Steve Wright, and directed by Gregor Jordan, Peter Templeman and Paul Oliver. The producer was Helen Panckhurst, with executive producers Tony Ayres and Penny Chapman. Old School was written by Belinda Chayko, Paul Oliver, Matt Cameron, Chris Hawkshaw, Gregor Jordan, Michaeley O’Brien and Nick Parsons, with script producers Tim Pye and Sarah Smith.

The song accompanying the opening titles is "Disguise" by Eleanor Dunlop.

Regular cast
 Bryan Brown as Lennie Cahill
 Sam Neill as Ted McCabe
 Sarah Peirse as Margaret McCabe
 Hanna Mangan-Lawrence as Shannon Cahill
 Mark Coles Smith as Jason Dhurkay
 Malcolm Kennard as Kurt Meeks
 Harry Greenwood as Zac
 Kate Box as Cath Khoury
 Peter Phelps as Chinese Begger
 Damian Walshe-Howling as Vince Pelagatti
 Sacha Horler as Rhonda

Episodes

References

External links

Australian Broadcasting Corporation original programming
2013 Australian television series debuts
English-language television shows
Television shows set in Sydney
Television series by Matchbox Pictures